This is a list of electoral division results for the 2013 Australian federal election in the state of Western Australia.

Overall results

Results by division

Brand

Canning

Cowan

Curtin

Durack

Forrest

Fremantle

Hasluck

Moore

O'Connor

Pearce

Perth

Stirling

Swan

Tangney

References

See also 

 Results of the 2013 Australian federal election (House of Representatives)
 Post-election pendulum for the 2013 Australian federal election
 Members of the Australian House of Representatives, 2013–2016

Western Australia 2013